Provinsmesterskabsturneringen i Fodbold was a knockout association football competition contested annually between 1913 and 1931, organised by the Danish FA (DBU), which determined the championship of the provinces (regions outside the main capital city, Copenhagen). Throughout the competition's existence, the five regional football championship clubs from Bornholm FA (BBU), Funen FA (FBU), Jutland FA (JBU), Lolland-Falster FA (LFBU) and Zealand FA (SBU) participated after the end of normal league season, except for the years 1916–1920 (Bornholm FA) and 1931 (Jutland FA). Until 1927, the cup tournament was part of the Danish Championship play-off, Landspokalturneringen, and was held prior to the Danish National Championship semifinal (1914 and 1916) or final. Beginning from the 1928-season, the regional championship became a separate tournament held alongside the Danish Championship (part of Danmarksmesterskabsturneringen i Fodbold), but still organised by the Danish FA, now under the official name of Provinsmesterskabsturneringen. The 1915 edition was not played due to the limitations imposed as a consequence of World War I. The tournament was abolished after the 1931 edition, where the Jutland FA representative, Esbjerg fB, withdrew from the competition due to lack of time in its schedule.

Since the first tournament in 1913, the winner would receive a diploma and could refer themselves as Vinder af Provinsmesterskabet i Fodbold or simply Provinsmester (Champions of the Provincial Football Championship) – no trophy was awarded. In principle the final was scheduled to be played on a neutral ground, which occurred on 9 occasions, while the rest of the finals ended up being played at the home field of one of the teams in the final – almost two-thirds of the finals (1916–18, 1920–22, 1924–26 and 1929–31) were played on a football field located in Odense. The most successful club in the history of the tournament's 18 editions was B 1901, who participated in all national tournaments by winning the regional Lolland-Falster league championship, winning a total of 7 provincial titles and appearing as a losing finalist on 4 occasions. As a result of the club's success, the Lolland-Falster FA became the most successful regional association, only fielding B 1901 as its representative during the tournament's entire duration.

Finals

Performances

Results by team 
Teams shown in italics are no longer in existence. B 1901 won the most championship titles and shares the record of losing the largest number of final matches with Frederiksborg IF Hillerød.

Results by association 
The single team, B 1901, that represented the Lolland-Falster FA throughout the tournament's entire history, single-handedly ensured that the regional association ended up with the most championship titles combined.

References 

Defunct football cup competitions in Denmark